Navajo Communications Company, Inc. is the operating company of Frontier Communications that provides telephone services in Arizona to the Navajo people.

Telephone service to the Navajo began in 1928 when the Bureau of Indian Affairs began building telephone lines to connect its facilities. In 1969, the BIA sold the system to Great Southwest Telephone Co. In 1981, Great Southwest Telephone was acquired by CP National. In 1988, CP National was acquired by Alltel. In 1994, Alltel sold off its operations for the Navajo to Citizens Communications. Citizens later changed its name to the current Frontier Communications.

The company is separate from Citizens Telecommunications Company of the White Mountains, which is a Frontier operating company formed in 1996 following the acquisition of former Contel/GTE service regions in Arizona.

References

Navajo mass media
Frontier Communications
Companies based in Arizona
Telecommunications companies established in 1994
1994 establishments in Arizona